Trent Garner is an American attorney and politician serving as a member of the Arkansas Senate from the 27th district. Elected in November 2016, he assumed office on 2017.

Early life and education 
Garner is a native of Magnolia, Arkansas. He earned a Bachelor of Arts degree in political science and government from the University of Arkansas at Little Rock, followed by a Master of Arts and Juris Doctor from the University of Arkansas School of Law.

Career 
Garner served in the United States Army Special Forces, completing two tours during the War in Afghanistan. He was elected to the Arkansas Senate in November 2016 and assumed office in 2017. Garner also serves as vice chair of the Senate State Agencies and Governmental Affairs Committee since 2019.  On May 2, 2022, Garner announced that he had re-enlisted in the US Army to serve as a Green Beret with the 20th Special Forces Group upon the completion of his term with the Arkansas Senate.

References 

Living people
Arkansas lawyers
University of Arkansas at Little Rock alumni
University of Arkansas School of Law alumni
Republican Party Arkansas state senators
People from Magnolia, Arkansas
People from Columbia County, Arkansas
Year of birth missing (living people)